B.X. Falls is a small waterfall just northeast of Vernon, British Columbia, Canada in electoral area C in the Regional District of North Okanagan.  It is located just downstream from Tillicum Road's crossing of B.X. Creek.  The falls are located in between Tillicum Road and Star Road, both of which branch off Silverstar Road.  A trail runs between the two roads and a short side trail descends into the canyon off the main trail and allows visitors to see the falls up close.

Stature
The falls are within a short but steep canyon along B.X. Creek just below where the creek passes under Tillicum Road.  The creek flows into the canyon, flows through a couple of small pools before cascading 30 feet into a small clearing in the canyon below.  The falls, while legitimately considered a "waterfall", are not all that steep, so in the winter when the falls freeze over and there is enough snow that piles on top of the ice on the falls it is actually quite easy to climb up the falls without any special equipment whatsoever.

References

External links
Youtube: Video of B.X. Falls

Waterfalls of British Columbia
Vernon, British Columbia
Osoyoos Division Yale Land District